Emily Theresa Russell, Baroness Ampthill, VA (9 September 1843 – 22 February 1927) was a British courtier.

Born Lady Emily Theresa Villiers, she was the third daughter of George Villiers, 4th Earl of Clarendon and his wife, Katherine. She was a bridesmaid to Princess Alexandra of Denmark on the latter's marriage to the Edward, Prince of Wales in 1863.

On 5 May 1868, she married Odo Russell (son of Lord George Russell) at Watford and they later had six children:

 Hon. Arthur Oliver Villiers Russell, later 2nd Baron Ampthill (1869–1935)
 Hon. Odo William Theopilus Villiers Russell (1870–1951)
 Hon. Constance Evelyn Villiers Russell (1872–1942)
Hon Alexander Victor Frederick Villiers Russell (1874-1965)
 Hon. Victor Alexander Frederick Villiers Russell (1874–1965)
 Hon. Augusta Louise Margaret Romola Villiers Russell (1879–1966)

In 1881, Odo was created Baron Ampthill. In 1885, the now Baroness Ampthill was appointed a Lady of the Bedchamber to Queen Victoria and was later appointed to the Royal Order of Victoria and Albert for her services.

In 1897, she was one of the guests at the Duchess of Devonshire’s Diamond Jubilee Costume Ball.

References

1843 births
1927 deaths
British baronesses
Daughters of British earls
Ladies of the Bedchamber
Ladies of the Royal Order of Victoria and Albert
Emily Russell, Baroness Ampthill
Emily Russell, Baroness Ampthill
Court of Queen Victoria